The Itaú-San Alberto gas field is a natural gas field located in the Tarija Department of Bolivia. It was discovered in 1998 and developed by Total S.A. It began production in 2004 and produces natural gas and condensates. The total proven reserves of the Itaú-San Alberto gas field are around 20.33 trillion cubic feet (581 km³), and production is slated to be around 200 million cubic feet/day (5.7×105m³).

References

Natural gas fields in Bolivia